Patriarch Dionysius of Constantinople may refer to:

 Dionysius I of Constantinople, Ecumenical Patriarch in 1466–1471 and 1488–1490
 Dionysius II of Constantinople, Ecumenical Patriarch in 1546–1556